Agrotis poliophaea is a moth of the family Noctuidae. It is found in Western Australia.

External links

Australian Faunal Directory
Image at CSIRO Entomology

Moths of Australia
Agrotis
Moths described in 1926